Nuno Borges and Francisco Cabral were the defending champions but lost in the semifinals to Hunter Reese and Sem Verbeek.

Reese and Verbeek won the title after defeating Sadio Doumbia and Fabien Reboul 4–6, 6–4, [10–7] in the final.

Seeds

Draw

References

External links
 Main draw

Open de Oeiras III - Doubles